In the second half of the 19th century, during the time of Nasser-al-Din Shah, a short horse-driven suburban railway was established south of Tehran that was later converted to steam. This line was closed in 1952.

The Tabriz–Jolfa–Julfa (Russia) line (146 km) was opened in 1915 (in 1916 official opening), the Sufian–Sharafkhaneh (53 km) in 1916, and the Mirjaveh–Zahedan (93 km) in 1920.
In 1915–1918, the Russians built and operated a military narrow-gauge railway Shakhtakhty (Russia) - Maku (Persia)- Bayazed (Turkey).

World War II 
The railroad was built with rail weighing 67 pounds per yard (33 kg/m) and required more than 3000 bridges. There were 126 tunnels in the Zagros mountains. The longest was 1.5 miles. Grades averaged 1.5 percent south of Tehran, but then increased to 2.8 percent to cross the 7,270-foot pass between Tehran and the Caspian Sea. After the Anglo-Soviet invasion of Iran in 1941, this Persian Corridor became one of the supply routes for war material for the Soviet Union during World War II, (Railway trend in Iran). The British built a  branch line from the 3000-foot (900-meter) bridge over the Karun River in Ahwaz to a new southern port at Khorramshahr on the Shatt al-Arab river. In 1943 3,473 American soldiers of the Military Railway Service began running trains between the Persian Gulf and Caspian Sea using ALCO RS-1 locomotives rebuilt with 3-axle trucks and designated RSD-1. The Americans set up headquarters in Ahwaz, but were unable to tolerate the daytime heat, and generally operated the railway at night.

Before the revolution 
After the transportation minister visited one of Japanese new high speed railway in 1975 he invited them to study a new high speed line between Tehran and Mashhad.
a delegation came to Iran for this study and their proposal was prepared with three options:

1- Double tracking, signaling and electrification of existing route with 160 km/h speed.

2- Constructing a new dedicated high speed line with 210 km/h like japan as the second country in the world.

3- Constructing a new dedicated high speed line with 270 km/h that was more than Japanese one.

and for the third one they explained the 10 year duration of project that was enough to develop the new generation of high speed trains.

Challenging construction
The Trans-Iranian railway traverses many mountain ranges, and is full of spirals and 1 in 36 ruling grades. Much of the terrain was unmapped when construction took place, and its geology unknown. Several stretches of line, including tunnels, were built through unsuitable geology, and had to be replaced even before the line opened. Nevertheless, the line was completed ahead of schedule.

In recent years the railways have undergone significant  extensions including the 1977 linking to the western railway system at the Turkish border, the 1993 opening of the Bandar Abbas line providing better access to the sea, and the 1996 opening of the Mashad–Sarakhs extension as part of the Silk Road railway to link to the landlocked Central Asian Countries.

Railway construction

References

Rail transport in Iran
Iran
Rail